Scott William Simpson (born September 17, 1955) is an American professional golfer.

Amateur career 
Simpson was born in San Diego, California, and played college golf at the University of Southern California, where he was two-time medalist at the NCAA Championship in 1976 and 1977. At the end of 1976 Golf Digest ranked Simpson the #1 amateur in the country.

Professional career 
He turned professional in 1977 and graduated in 1978. He played on the PGA Tour from 1979, and won seven PGA Tour events between 1980 and 1998.

The highlight of Simpson's career was the U.S. Open in 1987 at the Olympic Club in San Francisco, his only major title. He birdied the 14th, 15th, and 16th holes of the final round to overtake Tom Watson by one stroke and finished with a three under par total of 277.

Simpson became eligible to play senior golf in 2005 and won his first and only Champions Tour title in 2006.

In team competition, Simpson played for the United States in the Walker Cup in 1977 and the Ryder Cup in 1987. He lists bible study among his interests and attributes his success to it.  He and his wife Cheryl have two children: Brea Yoshiko and Sean.

Simpson was previously a Democrat (during Bill Clinton's presidency he was the only PGA Tour player vocally to support him), but became a Republican later on and supported George W. Bush.

Amateur wins
this list may be incomplete
1976 NCAA Division I Championship, Porter Cup
1977 NCAA Division I Championship

Professional wins (16)

PGA Tour wins (7)

*Note: The 1998 Buick Invitational was shortened to 54 holes due to rain.

PGA Tour playoff record (2–3)

Japan Golf Tour wins (3)

Japan Golf Tour playoff record (2–0)

Other wins (5)
1979 Hawaii State Open
1981 Hawaii State Open
1990 Perrier Invitational (Europe, not a European Tour event)
1993 Hawaii State Open
1994 Hawaii State Open

Champions Tour wins (1)

Major championships

Wins (1)

Results timeline

CUT = missed the halfway cut
"T" indicates a tie for a place.

Summary

Most consecutive cuts made – 12 (1982 U.S. Open – 1986 Masters)
Longest streak of top-10s – 2 (1993 Open Championship – 1993 PGA)

Results in The Players Championship

CUT = missed the halfway cut
"T" indicates a tie for a place

U.S. national team appearances
Amateur
Walker Cup: 1977 (winners)

Professional
Ryder Cup: 1987
Kirin Cup: 1987 (winners)

See also
Fall 1978 PGA Tour Qualifying School graduates

References

External links

American male golfers
USC Trojans men's golfers
PGA Tour golfers
PGA Tour Champions golfers
Ryder Cup competitors for the United States
Winners of men's major golf championships
Golfers from San Diego
1955 births
Living people